The Auslegeschrift was, in German patent law, the second reading, or publication, of a patent application. It has been examined and published.

German patents are often numbered or cited by the Auslegeschrift. This staged system was, from 1981 onwards, dropped. However, it continues to exist in many patent searches.

See also
 European patent law
 History of patent law
 Glossary of patent law terms

References

German patent law
Legal history of Germany